Cody Mathès Gakpo (born 7 May 1999) is a Dutch professional footballer who plays as a forward for  club Liverpool and the Netherlands national team.
 
A PSV academy graduate, Gakpo made his first-team debut in February 2018. In the 2021–22 season, he won the Dutch Footballer of the Year award after scoring 21 goals in 47 games in all competitions. He signed for Liverpool in January 2023.

Gakpo played youth international football for the Netherlands from under-18 to under-21 level. He made his senior international debut in June 2021 at UEFA Euro 2020.

Early life and youth 
Gakpo was born in Eindhoven and raised in the district of Stratum. His father was born in Togo and has Ghanaian ancestry, while his mother is Dutch. In 2007, he moved to the youth academy of PSV, where he then progressed through all of the youth teams.

Club career

PSV

Jong PSV
For the 2016–17 season Gakpo was part of the reserve team Jong PSV for the first time, but mainly featured in the U19 team. Gakpo made his professional debut in the Eerste Divisie for Jong PSV on 4 November 2016 in a game against Helmond Sport. In the rest of the season he only made one more appearance for Jong PSV. After his production increased in the following season's U19 Eredivisie with seven goals and five assists in 13 league games, he was finally promoted to the reserves at the turn of the year. In his second appearance in the second-tier Eerste Divisie, on 19 January 2017 in a 3–2 away win against De Graafschap, he scored a brace and made the assist for the third goal of his team. For Jong PSV, he managed to score seven goals in the 2017–18 season, which he achieved in 12 league games.

First team
Gakpo made his first team debut for PSV as an injury-time substitute in a 3–1 victory over Feyenoord on 25 February 2018. In the 2018–19 season, Gakpo was able to further improve his performances. This was also noticed by first team coach, Mark van Bommel. He was selected several times for the matchday squad of the first team in the first half of the season. He would initially, however, remain an unused substitute. In the 5–1 home win against the Go Ahead Eagles on 3 December 2018, he scored the first hat-trick of his professional career. After he scored a goal and got an assist in the 5–2 home win against Almere City on 21 December, he made his debut in the Eredivisie just one day later. In the 3–1 home win against AZ, he was substituted on for Steven Bergwijn in the closing stages. He scored nine goals in ten league games for Jong PSV by the end of the year and was subsequently promoted to become a regular member of the first team. On 3 February 2019, he scored his first league goal in his second appearance in a 5–0 home win over Fortuna Sittard and also assisted another goal. By the end of the season he made 14 league appearances, but without being able to record another goal.

In the 2019–20 season, he made his breakthrough in the Eredivisie and recorded seven goals and as many assists in 25 league games.

On 13 September 2020, the first matchday of the 2020–21 Eredivisie season, Gakpo scored his first brace for PSV, contributing to a 3–1 win over Groningen. He scored another brace on 24 September in the 5–1 victory in the UEFA Europa League qualifier against NŠ Mura, allowing PSV to qualify for the play-off round. He was again decisive there, on scoring PSV's second goal in a 2–0 win over Rosenborg on 1 October. He finished the season with 29 appearances, in which he scored 11 goals.

Gakpo scored the winning goal for PSV in a 2–1 win over Ajax in the 2022 KNVB Cup Final. On 31 August 2022, he scored his first hat-trick in a 7–1 win over Volendam.

Liverpool
On 28 December 2022, Gakpo agreed to sign for Premier League club Liverpool once the transfer window opened on 1 January 2023. He was reported by BBC Sport to have agreed a five-and-a-half-year contract, for a transfer fee of between £35.4 to £44.3 million (€40 to €50 million), which would be a record fee received by PSV. He made his debut for the club as a starter in a 2–2 third-round FA Cup tie at Anfield against  Wolves on 7 January 2023. Gakpo scored his first goal for Liverpool in 2–0 a Merseyside derby league victory over Everton on 13 February.  He scored a brace of goals against Liverpool's arch rivals Manchester United on 5 March 2023.

International career

Gakpo was eligible to play for the Netherlands, Ghana or Togo at international level. He played youth international football for the Netherlands at under-18, under-19, under-20 and under-21 levels.

Gakpo was called up to the senior Netherlands squad for UEFA Euro 2020 and made his debut in the third match of the group stage against North Macedonia as a substitute in the 79th minute for Frenkie de Jong. Thereby, he became the first Netherlands player to make his international debut at a European Championship since Martien Vreijsen in 1980.

Gakpo was named in the squad for the 2022 FIFA World Cup in Qatar and had an immediate impact, scoring in three consecutive group matches against Senegal, Ecuador, and Qatar.

Style of play
Usually deployed on the left wing, Gakpo often cuts inside on his right foot to move to a more central attacking position, and uses his speed and dribbling skills to take on defenders until he finds the space to make an attempt on goal.

Personal life
Gakpo is a Pentecostal Christian. He has said, "I try to read the Bible every day, I pray every day, I like to go to church, and I read many books about the faith".

Career statistics

Club

International

Scores and results list the Netherlands' goal tally first, score column indicates score after each Gakpo goal.

Honours
PSV
Eredivisie: 2017–18
KNVB Cup: 2021–22
Johan Cruyff Shield: 2021, 2022

Individual
Dutch Footballer of the Year: 2021–22
Eredivisie Player of the Month: September 2022, October 2022

References

External links

Profile at the Liverpool F.C. website
Profile at the Royal Dutch Football Association website (in Dutch)

1999 births
Living people
Footballers from Eindhoven
Dutch footballers
Association football wingers
Jong PSV players
PSV Eindhoven players
Liverpool F.C. players
Eerste Divisie players
Eredivisie players
Premier League players
Netherlands youth international footballers
Netherlands under-21 international footballers
Netherlands international footballers
UEFA Euro 2020 players
2022 FIFA World Cup players
Dutch expatriate footballers
Expatriate footballers in England
Dutch expatriate sportspeople in England
Dutch sportspeople of Ghanaian descent
Dutch people of Togolese descent
Dutch Christians